Department of Apocalyptic Affairs is the second album by the Norwegian avant-garde metal band Fleurety.

Style 

The album shows Fleurety moving away from black metal to get into a more avant-garde and experimental sound, adding trip hop, electronic, jazz, death metal, Circus music, industrial, art rock and contemporary classical elements. William York of AllMusic likened the album's sound to that of Mr. Bungle, Portishead and fellow Norwegian acts Ulver and Arcturus.

Fleurety used many guest musicians from the Norwegian music scene, including members (or former members) from Mayhem, Ulver, Head Control System, Borknagar, Arcturus, Winds, Tritonus, Beyond Dawn, Virus, Ved Buens Ende, Aura Noir and Dødheimsgard.

Track listing
"Exterminators" – 6:50
"Face in a Fever" – 6:16
"Shotgun Blast" – 5:20
"Fingerprint" – 7:01
"Facets 2.0" – 5:14
"Last Minute Lies" – 7:54
"Barb Wire Smile (Snap Ant Version)" – 6:55
"Face in a Fever (Nordgaren Edit)" – 4:27

Track 8 is unlisted.

Credits

Fleurety
Alexander Nordgaren : guitar
Svein Egil Hatlevik : drums, synthesizer, vocals
Per Amund Solberg : bass

Guest musicians

Vocals
Karianne Horn (tracks 1, 4)
Maniac (track 3)
Heidi Gjermundsen (tracks 5, 7)
Vilde Lockert (track 6)
G. Playa (track 6)

Lead guitar
Knut Magne Valle (track 1)
Carl August Tidemann (tracks 2, 4)

Drums
Hellhammer (track 1)
Einar Sjursø (track 2)
Carl-Michael Eide (track 5)

Programming
Tore Ylwizaker (tracks 3, 4, 6)
James Morgan (track 7)

Miscellaneous
Mari Solberg (saxophone on tracks 1, 2, 5, 7)
Steinar "Sverd" Johnsen (synthesizer on track 2)

References 

2000 albums
Fleurety albums